Arnie David Giralt Rivero (born 26 August 1984, Santiago de Cuba) is a Cuban triple jumper.

Career
His personal best jump is 17.62 metres, achieved in April 2009 in La Habana. His father is long jumper David Giralt.

Personal bests

Competition record

References

External links
 
 
 Tilastopaja biography

1984 births
Living people
Sportspeople from Santiago de Cuba
Cuban male triple jumpers
Cuban people of African descent
Athletes (track and field) at the 2004 Summer Olympics
Athletes (track and field) at the 2008 Summer Olympics
Athletes (track and field) at the 2012 Summer Olympics
Olympic athletes of Cuba
IAAF World Athletics Final winners